K. M. Shaji (born 22 December 1971) is an Indian politician belonging to the Indian Union Muslim League. He is the president of Muslim Youth League in Kerala, a secretariat member of the League, and the treasurer of the Muslim League parliamentary party.

He was disqualified as an MLA by the High Court of Kerala on 9 November 2018 on allegations of communalizing the 2016 assembly election held in the Azhikode assembly constituency, which was later stayed by the Supreme Court of India.

Personal life 
Son of Shri K.M. Beeran Kutty and Smt. P.C. Aysha Kutty; born at Kaniyambetta. He was married to Smt. Asha K.M and the couple have one daughter and two sons. He had done Pre-Degree and B.B.A. (not completed).

Political career
He was School leader of G.H.S. Kaniyambetta,  Chairman of Calicut University Union. He had been elected as  Vice President and President, Kaniyambetta Grama Panchayat. He was the secretary and president of State Youth League.

He contested the 2006 general assembly election from Eravipuram constituency in Kollam and lost to A. A. Aziz of RSP. K M Shaji was alleged on Plus Two Bribery Case. Later in 2021 Kerala Assembly Election he lost to K V Sumesh of the CPIM with a margin of 6141 votes. As of 2021, he is neither a MLA, nor a panchayath member.

Assembly election candidature history

Vigilance Raid 
The Vigilance and Anti-Corruption Bureau (VACB) has seized Rs 50 lakh in a raid conducted on 12 April 2021, Monday at his house at Manal, near Azhikode in Kannur.

The vigilance team conducted raids simultaneously at his houses at Kannur and Kozhikode for allegedly amassing assets disproportionate to his known sources of income. The raid was conducted by the vigilance team from Kozhikode.

A court here in November last had ordered a Vigilance probe against the Azhikode MLA on allegations that he amassed assets disproportionate to his known sources of income.

The court's direction came on a petition by the social worker and lawyer M R Hareesh alleging that Shaji had amassed wealth disproportionate to his known sources of income and had received funds from abroad, misusing his official powers.

The petitioner, who sought a direction to the Vigilance for a probe, also alleged that Shaji filed false details regarding his wealth in his election affidavit.

The MLA has properties in Wayanad, Kannur, and Kozhikode districts, worth a minimum of Rupees two crore, the complaint alleged.

The Enforcement Directorate had also registered a case in connection with the receipt of overseas funds by Shaji and had searched his residence in Chirakkal in Kannur late last year.

Shaji claims that, he made his fortune from ginger cultivation in Karnataka and Wayanad. Ginger cultivation was not included in the affidavit on property information as it was not fixed income.

See also
 Indian Union Muslim League
 Muslim Youth League

References 

1971 births
Living people
Indian Union Muslim League politicians
People from Wayanad district
Kerala MLAs 2016–2021
Kerala MLAs 2011–2016